Super Bad is a live album by American musician James Brown. The album was released in 1971 by King Records.

Track listing

References

1971 albums
James Brown albums
Albums produced by James Brown
King Records (United States) albums